Palaeoloxodon creutzburgi is an extinct species of elephant known from the Middle-Late Pleistocene of Crete. It is a descendant of the large mainland species Palaeoloxodon antiquus. It is known from localities across the island. P. chaniensis from Stylos and in Vamos cave, Chania, west Crete is considered to be a junior synonym of P. creutzburgi. It had undergone insular dwarfism, being approximately 40% of the size of its mainland ancestor, and was around the size of the living Asian elephant. It lived alongside the radiation of Candiacervus deer endemic to the island.

See also
Dwarf elephant

References

Palaeoloxodon
Pleistocene proboscideans
Pleistocene species
Pleistocene mammals of Europe
Fossil taxa described in 2001
Prehistoric Crete
Fauna of Crete